A Malament–Hogarth (M-H) spacetime, named after David B. Malament and Mark Hogarth, is a relativistic spacetime that possesses the following property: there exists a worldline  and an event p such that all events along  are a finite interval in the past of p, but the proper time along  is infinite. The event p is known as an M-H event.

Significance 
The significance of M-H spacetimes is that they allow for the implementation of certain non-Turing computable tasks (hypercomputation). Since  lies in p's past, the Turing machine can signal (a solution) to p at any stage of this never-ending task. Meanwhile, the observer takes a quick trip (finite proper time) through spacetime to p, to pick up the solution. The set-up can be used to decide the halting problem, which is known to be undecidable by an ordinary Turing machine. All the observer needs to do is to prime the Turing machine to signal to p if and only if the Turing machine halts.

Examples 
The Kerr metric, which describes empty spacetime around a rotating black hole, possesses these features: a computer can orbit the black hole indefinitely, while an observer falling into the black hole experiences an M-H event as they cross the inner event horizon. (This, however, neglects the effects of black hole evaporation.)

References 

 Earman, J., 1995, Bangs Crunches Whimpers and Shrieks: Singularities and Acausalities in Relativistic Spacetimes.  Oxford: Oxford University Press.
 Earman, J. and Norton, J., 1993,  ‘Forever is a Day: Supertasks in Pitowsky and Malament-Hogarth Spacetimes’, Philosophy of Science, 5, 22–42.
 Earman, J. and Norton, J., 1994, ‘Infinite Pains: The Trouble with Supertasks’, to appear in S. Stich (ed), Paul Benacerraf: The Philosopher and His Critics.  New York: Blackwell.
 Hogarth, M., 1992, ‘Does General Relativity Allow an Observer to View an Eternity in a Finite Time?’, Foundations of Physics Letters, 5, 173–181.
 Hogarth, M., 1994, ‘Non-Turing Computers and Non-Turing Computability’, in D. Hull, M. Forbes, and R. M. Burian (eds), PSA 1994, Vol. 1. East Lansing: Philosophy of Science Association, 126–138. 
 Hogarth, M., 1996, 'Predictability, Computability and Spacetime', Ph.D. Thesis, University of Cambridge .
 Hogarth, M. 2004, ‘Deciding Arithmetic Using SAD Computers’, The British Journal for the Philosophy of Science 55: 681–691.
 Welch, P.D., 2006, 'The Extent of Computation in Malament-Hogarth Spacetimes', preprint.
 Manchak, John Byron (2009) On the Possibility of Supertasks in General Relativity. [Preprint] 

General relativity
Hypercomputation